Robert Clinton Way (April 2, 1906 – June 20, 1974) was a Major League Baseball player who played in  with the Chicago White Sox.

Way played in 5 games, going 1–3.

He was born in Emlenton, Pennsylvania, and died in Pittsburgh, Pennsylvania.

External links

1906 births
1974 deaths
People from Emlenton, Pennsylvania
Baseball players from Pennsylvania
Chicago White Sox players